Korakkar is originally a Tamil Siddhar, and one of the 18 celebrated siddhars of Tamilnadu. He is none other than Gorakhnath, the Siddha as he is venerated throughout India. He was a student of the Siddhars Agathiyar and Bogar, and is mentioned various times in the works of Bogar. His Jeeva samadhi temple is in Vadukupoigainallur of Nagapattinam district of Tamil Nadu. He spent his growing-up years in the Velliangiri Mountains in Coimbatore.

Other sanctums related with Korakkar are Perur, Thiruchendur and Triconamalli. Korakkar caves are found in Chaturagiri and Kolli Hills. Like other siddhas, Korakkar has written songs on Medicine, Philosophy, and Alchemy.

His works include Korakkar Malai Vagatam (Korakkar's Mountain Medicines), Malai Vaakadam, Korakkar Vaippu, Kaalamegam, Marali Varadham, Nilaiyodukam, Chandhira Regai Nool, and many more.

Korakkar has predicted the future events and written in Chandhira Regai Nool.One of such event predicted by him was that Bogar will born again in the world when people lose their faith in god.

The cave of Korakkar where he stayed for a long time is located in Sathuragiri, a village in Tamil Nadu.

References 

Siddha medicine
Tamil Hindu saints
Indian Hindu saints
People from Coimbatore district
Indian Shaivite religious leaders
Navnath